Hei Zhi Hong (born 18 September 1975) is a Hong Kong wushu athlete. He won a silver medal during the 2006 Asian Games in the taijiquan competition.

References 

1975 births
Hong Kong wushu practitioners
Living people
Asian Games medalists in wushu
Wushu practitioners at the 2010 Asian Games
Wushu practitioners at the 2006 Asian Games
Asian Games silver medalists for Hong Kong
Medalists at the 2006 Asian Games
Competitors at the 2008 Beijing Wushu Tournament
World Games medalists in wushu
Tai chi practitioners